Bhageeratha is a 2005 Telugu action drama film directed by Rasool Ellore. The film stars Ravi Teja and Shriya Saran in the lead roles. Bhageeratha was an average grosser at the box office. The film was dubbed in Hindi as The Return of Sikander in 2008.

Cast

Soundtrack
The music was composed by Chakri and released by Aditya Music.

References

External links
 

2000s Telugu-language films
2005 films
Films scored by Chakri